The slimy sculpin (Cottus cognatus) is a freshwater species of fish belonging to the family Cottidae, which is the largest sculpin family. They usually inhabit cold rocky streams or lakes across North America, ranging from the Great Lakes, southeast Minnesota, northeast Iowa, southwest Wisconsin and northeast Canada. Slimy sculpins have also been found roaming the cold streams of eastern Siberia.
They are commonly confused with their closely related relatives, Mottled sculpin (Cottus bairdi), and with tubenose gobies who are both freshwater fishes as well. 
The slimy sculpin is a nocturnal fish that usually spends most of its time on the stream bottom and seeks shelter under rocks and logs, especially during spawning season. When it swims, it sometimes appears to be "hopping" along the bottom because of its inefficient ability to swim. This is partly due to the absence of a swim bladder, which normally gives buoyancy to a fish.

The fish has been studied in waters where there is current freshwater acidification. Sculpin were found to be less active and have lower rates of reproduction when found in these waters. For these reasons, slimy sculpin have been identified as a good indicator species for changes in acidification among lakes, ponds, and streams.

Distribution
Slimy sculpin are native to the United States, Canada, and the Russian Federation. In North America, slimy sculpins are found mainly in Lake Superior and its tributaries, Lake Michigan, and small cold streams found in southwestern Wisconsin, as well as the upper Mississippi River basin. They have also been found in other areas of North America such as southeast Minnesota (mostly in the Mississippi River), northeast Iowa, the upper Columbia River, Alaska, and most all of Canada, especially in Ottawa. Slimy sculpins have also been found in eastern Siberia, Russia.

Physical description
The slimy sculpin can easily be distinguished by its pair of free and independent pelvic fins, as well as not possessing any scales. The first and second lobed dorsal fins are narrow and touch, the first dorsal fin has 7–9 soft spines while the second has 16–18 fin rays. The lateral line ends below the second dorsal fin and is incomplete, but the lateral line system still helps orient the slimy sculpin in streams by balancing the pressure of currents. The anal fin has 11–13 fin rays and the pelvic fins possess 13–14 fin rays and is in the thoracic position. The mouth and snout are terminal and very wide, and also contain a band of fine conical teeth in both the upper and lower jaw, but do not possess barbels. Adults weigh in around 3-7g and measure up to 6.3–9.1 cm long. The maximum weight of a slimy sculpin is 16.86g and the maximum length is 12.8 cm. When the fish moves, it is an inconsistently rapid and darter-like motion that looks like it's hopping due to its irregular compressed body shape. 
The sides, back and head of slimy sculpins are dark brown/olive and are mottled with dark irregular blotches and a light cream/white belly. If slimy sculpins lie motionless for a while they camouflage in so well with their surroundings that it is almost impossible to distinguish them. Although they don't have any scales, they do have a few fine prickles anteriorly below the lateral line. Slimy sculpins often look very similar to the tubenose goby as well.

Habitat
Slimy sculpins often inhabit swift rocky-bottomed cold streams, oligotrophic lakes, and even brackish waters at a preferred temperature range of 9-14 °C. Nocturnally active fishes, they usually roam around in deeper waters ranging from 37–108 meters deep. During the breeding season, females often lay their eggs under sheltered areas like large objects such as rocks or tree roots found at the bottom of lakes or streams that males will guard.

Reproduction
Males often become dark on their backs and sides, and orange on their first dorsal fin during mating season. Males having orange on their first dorsal fin during breeding season is a survival disadvantage, meaning that they can be more easily preyed upon, yet still survive- showing to females that they are fit and have high reproductive success, therefore females are more attracted to these visually distinctive males. Males find nesting sites about 12 cm wide for females, and attract them to these nesting sites until spawning occurs which usually takes place in late April and May under protected areas such as stones or tree roots. Once the eggs are laid, males drive the females out and lure a new female into the nest to lay her eggs. Males then protect the nest for 3–4 weeks containing many females' eggs until all of the eggs hatch. Male slimy sculpins have also been seen protecting their young after hatching as well. Slimy sculpins live up to 4–7 years.

Diet
The primary food slimy sculpin prey on is invertebrate benthic insects, which make up 85% or more of their diet, but has also been known to eat crustaceans, fish eggs, and small fish. The invertebrate benthic insects on which the sculpin prey includes aquatic insects such as mayflies, caddis flies, stoneflies, and dragonflies. Predatious fish that eat slimy sculpin are lake trout, brook trout, salmon, northern pike, and burbot that are native to cool freshwater streams just like the slimy sculpin. There is speculation that sculpins have been known to prey on trout egg that were loose from the redds. However, sculpins predation on stoneflies has reduced stonefly predation on trout eggs and their young.

Conservation status
This species is currently at low concern for conservative action and does not need protection or major management plans.

References

External links 

Cottus (fish)
Freshwater fish of the Arctic
Fish of the Great Lakes
Fish described in 1836